Alicia Violet Johnson (born 24 December 1998) is an English footballer who plays as a full-back for Durham in the FA Women's Championship.

Club career
A product of Blackburn Rovers' Centre of Excellence, Johnson joined the senior team in the 2015–16 season, scoring 6 goals in 17 appearances in all competitions. In February 2016, Johnson left the club to join Liverpool's youth development programme. She made her senior debut on 19 March 2017, in a 2–1 win over Everton in the fifth round of the FA Women's Cup. On 11 October 2017, she scored her first goal for the Reds in a 6–0 victory against Sheffield in the Continental Cup. On 23 November 2017, Johnson signed a new contract with the club. She finished the 2017–18 season with three goals in 18 appearances in all competitions. On 20 July 2018, she was released by the club following the expiration of her contract. On 24 July 2018, she joined Bristol City.

International career
In July 2018, she was selected in the squad for the 2018 FIFA U-20 Women's World Cup in France.

Career statistics

Club
.

References

External links
Ali Johnson at Liverpool F.C.

Women's association football midfielders
English women's footballers
Women's Super League players
Living people
FA Women's National League players
1998 births
Blackburn Rovers L.F.C. players
Liverpool F.C. Women players
Bristol City W.F.C. players
Sheffield United W.F.C. players
Durham W.F.C. players